Gilbert Bayard Colgate Jr. (December 21, 1899 – October 9, 1965) was an American businessman and bobsledder who competed in the 1930s. He won the bronze medal in the two-man event at the 1936 Winter Olympics in Garmisch-Partenkirchen, with teammate Richard Lawrence.
He was born and died in New York City.

Colgate, a 1922 Yale University graduate, and brother of the Delta Kappa Epsilon fraternity (Phi chapter); was also one of five children of Gilbert Colgate Sr., who was the great-grandson of William Colgate, who founded what is now the Colgate-Palmolive Company. He served as a director of the Colgate company and was chairman of the Colgate-Larsen Aircraft Company. Gil Colgate was concerned about the population explosion and became one of the founders of Planned Parenthood.

References
Bobsleigh two-man Olympic medalists 1932-56 and since 1964
DatabaseOlympics.com profile
Biographical Dictionary of American Business article on Colgate's father - Accessed August 11, 2007.
Ivy League sports featuring Colgate
"Sport: Bobbers". Time. March 5, 1934.

1899 births
1965 deaths
American male bobsledders
Bobsledders at the 1936 Winter Olympics
Olympic bronze medalists for the United States in bobsleigh
Sportspeople from New York City
Yale University alumni
Medalists at the 1936 Winter Olympics
Colgate family